Questions of Travel is a 2012 novel by Australian author Michelle de Kretser. It won the 2013 Miles Franklin Award and the 2013 Prime Minister's Literary Award for Fiction.

Description
The novel concerns two main characters: Laura—an Australian woman who travels the world before returning to Sydney to work for a publisher of travel guides—and Ravi—an IT professional from Sri Lanka who flees his country after a major trauma.  The novel "illuminates travel, work and modern dreams in this brilliant evocation of the way we live now."

Owen Richardson, in his review of the novel in The Monthly described it as "...a big, ambitious novel of Sydney and the world, globalisation and divided identities. It is everywhere full of intelligence and a vivid sense of individual lives."

The novel's title, Questions of Travel, is a homage to a poem of the same name by Elizabeth Bishop.

Awards
 2013 winner Western Australian Premier's Book Awards — Premier's Prize 
 2013 winner Western Australian Premier's Book Awards — Fiction 
 2013 winner Miles Franklin Award
 2013 winner Prime Minister's Literary Awards — Fiction 
 2013 shortlisted Australian Book Industry Awards (ABIA) — Australian Literary Fiction Book of the Year
 2013 shortlisted Kibble Literary Awards — Nita Kibble Literary Award 
 2013 winner Australian Literature Society Gold Medal
 2013 shortlisted The Stella Prize
 2013 shortlisted Indie Awards — Fiction
 2014 winner New South Wales Premier's Literary Awards — Book of the Year 
 2014 joint winner New South Wales Premier's Literary Awards — Community Relations Commission Award With Andrew Bovell's stage adaptation of The Secret River. 
 2014 winner New South Wales Premier's Literary Awards — Christina Stead Prize for Fiction 
 2014 shortlisted Adelaide Festival Awards for Literature — Award for Fiction 
 2014 shortlisted Victorian Premier's Literary Awards — The Vance Palmer Prize for Fiction 
 2014 shortlisted International Dublin Literary Award

Notes
The novel carried the following dedication:
 "In memory of Leah Akie".

It also contained the following epigraphs:
 "Under cosmopolitanism, if it comes, we shall receive no help from the earth. Trees and meadows and mountains will only be a spectacle...." E.M. Forster Howards End.
 "But surely it would have been a pity not to have seen the trees along this road, really exaggerated in their beauty." Elizabeth Bishop Questions of Travel.
 "Anywhere! Anywhere!" Charles Baudelaire Anywhere Out of the World.

Reviews
 Frank Moorhouse in The Guardian: "Australia has been waiting for a book which looks into the face of travel and sees it for all the illusions and traps and shallowness and, sometimes, life-changing meaning that it offers or withholds."
 Randy Boyagoda in The New York Times: "Like our expectations of travel, as opposed to the realities we usually experience, de Kretser’s novel is a book full of promise that offers many passing wonders and intensities amid a lot of busy-making and slack time."

References

2012 Australian novels
Miles Franklin Award-winning works
Novels set in Sydney
Novels set in Sri Lanka
ALS Gold Medal winning works
Allen & Unwin books